Kozhiyalam Satagopacharya (born July 1916, date of death unknown) was a multilingual scholar from Tirupati.

Life
He was born in July 1916 in Therani on the banks of River Kusasthali on the Tamil Nadu border. He has taught Sanskrit for more than 25 years in the TTD’s Sri Venkateswara Oriental College. He knew Tamil, Telugu, Sanskrit and English. He was appointed as a reader in kendriya Sanskrit vidhyapeetha, but died before he could take on this appointment.

Works
Tamil and Telugu commentaries on ‘Sri Venkateswara Ashtothara Sathanamavali’, Vedanta Desika’s ‘Dayasatakam’
Sanskrit commentary‘Vidhitraya Paritranam

References

1916 births
Year of death missing
People from Tirupati
Tamil scholars
Indian Sanskrit scholars